Plaid is a financial services company based in San Francisco, California. The company builds a data transfer network that powers fintech and digital finance products.

Plaid's product, a technology platform, enables applications to connect with users’ bank accounts. It allows consumers and businesses to interact with their bank accounts, check balances, and make payments through different financial technology applications. The company operates in the U.S., Canada, the UK, France, Spain, Ireland, and the Netherlands.

On January 13, 2020, Visa announced it was intending to acquire Plaid for $5.3 billion. Visa later abandoned the deal after opposition by the United States Department of Justice due to data privacy, antitrust risks and monopolist  reasons.

History 
Plaid was founded in 2013 by Zach Perret and William Hockey. The pair originally attempted to build consumer financial management products, including budgeting and bookkeeping software. When confronted with difficulties in connecting bank accounts required for these tools, they decided to pivot their core business focus to a unified banking API.

Services 
Plaid builds a data transfer network that powers Fintech and digital finance products. From the consumer side, this means they allow common apps such as Venmo and Chime to offer banking services without having to develop all the infrastructure themselves. For immediate linking of their bank funds, users of the apps are required to share their bank login credentials with Plaid. For some banks, Plaid will not receive user credentials and instead users will authorize access to bank data through their bank's portal. 

In October 2020, Plaid announced the "all-new Plaid Link" to reduce the steps necessary to connect financial products.

Funding 
In late 2013, Plaid raised a $2.8million seed round from Spark Capital, Google Ventures, and New Enterprise Associates. In 2014, Plaid raised $12.5million from New Enterprise Associates.

On December 11, 2018, the company announced a $250million Series C round with a valuation of $2.65billion. The funding round was led by Mary Meeker, with Andreessen Horowitz and Index Ventures joining as new investors. Former backers Goldman Sachs, NEA and Spark Capital also participated. It was later revealed by Plaid that both Visa and Mastercard had invested in the round.

On April 7, 2021, Plaid raised a $425million Series D at a valuation of $13.4 billion.

Acquisition 
In January 2019, Plaid acquired competitor Quovo for $200 million.

On January 13, 2020, Plaid announced that it had signed a definitive agreement to be acquired by Visa for $5.3 billion. The deal was double the company's most recent Series C round valuation of $2.65 billion, and was expected to close in the next 3–6 months, subject to regulatory review and closing conditions. According to the deal, Visa would pay $4.9 billion in cash and approximately $400 million of retention equity and deferred equity, according to a presentation deck prepared by Visa.

Visa’s CEO Alfred Kelly described the acquisition as an "insurance policy" to neutralize a "threat to our important US debit business."

On November 5, 2020, the United States Department of Justice filed a lawsuit seeking to block the acquisition, arguing that Visa is a monopolist trying to eliminate a competitive threat by purchasing Plaid. Visa said it disagrees with the lawsuit and "intends to defend the transaction vigorously."

On January 12, 2021, Plaid announced the proposed merger agreement had been officially terminated almost exactly a year after its initial public announcement of the deal.

In January 2022, Plaid announced it had acquired the identity verification and compliance platform, Cognito, for an undisclosed sum.

Controversy 
The company has faced controversy for scraping user data, impersonating bank login screens, and not properly disclosing the privacy risks associated with the service. TD Bank filed a lawsuit against Plaid in 2020 accusing the company of trying to "dupe" its users.

In 2021, Plaid settled a $58 million class action lawsuit over claims that it passed on personal banking data to third party firms without user consent. The settlement encompasses five separate lawsuits combined as one. Each claims that Plaid used consumers’ banking login credentials to gather and distribute detailed financial data without prior consent. 

Plaid has "exploited its position as middleman," the plaintiffs alleged. Approximately 98 million people are affected by the settlement. Claimants will be given the option to receive the settlement money automatically through payment platforms such as PayPal and Venmo.

See also
Yodlee

References 

Financial services companies established in 2013
American companies established in 2013
Technology companies based in the San Francisco Bay Area
Companies based in San Francisco
Financial technology companies
2013 establishments in California
Merchant services
Financial services companies based in California